Carolyn Haywood (January 3, 1898 – January 11, 1990) was an American writer and illustrator from Philadelphia, Pennsylvania. She created 47 children's books, most notably the series under the "Eddie" and "Betsy" titles.

Selected works

Betsy Books
 “B” is for Betsy. New York: Harcourt Brace, 1939.
 Betsy and Billy. New York: Harcourt Brace, 1941.
 Back to School With Betsy. New York: Harcourt Brace, 1943.
 Betsy and the Boys. New York: Harcourt Brace, 1945.
 Betsy’s Little Star. New York: Morrow, 1950.
 Betsy and the Circus. New York: Morrow, 1954.
 Betsy's Busy Summer. New York: Morrow, 1956.
 Betsy's Winterhouse. New York: Morrow, 1958.
 Snowbound with Betsy. New York: Morrow, 1962.
 Betsy and Mr. Kilpatrick. New York: Morrow, 1967.
 Merry Christmas from Betsy. New York: Morrow, 1970.
 Betsy's Play School. New York: Morrow, 1977. Illustrated by James Griffin.

Eddie Books
 Little Eddie. New York: Morrow, 1947.
 Eddie and the Fire Engine. New York: Morrow, 1949.
 Eddie and Gardenia.  New York: Morrow, 1951.
 Eddie's Pay Dirt. New York: Morrow, 1953.
 Eddie and his Big Deals. New York: Morrow, 1955.
 Eddie Makes Music. New York: Morrow, 1957.
 Eddie and Louella. New York: Morrow, 1959
 Annie Pat and Eddie. New York: Morrow, 1960.
 Eddie's Green Thumb. New York: Morrow, 1964.
 Eddie the Dog Holder.  New York: Morrow, 1966.
 Ever-ready Eddie. New York: Morrow, 1968
 Eddie's Happenings. New York: Morrow, 1971.
 Eddie's Valuable Property. New York: Morrow, 1975.
 Eddie’s Menagerie. New York: Morrow, 1978. Illustrated by Ingrid Fetz.
 Merry Christmas from Eddie. New York: Morrow, 1986.
 Eddie's Friend Boodles. New York: Morrow, 1991. Illustrated by Catherine Stock.

Other Books
 Primrose Day. New York: Harcourt Brace, 1942.
 Here's a Penny. New York: Harcourt Brace, 1944.
 Penny and Peter. New York: Harcourt Brace, 1946.
 Penny Goes to Camp. New York: Morrow, 1948.
 The Mixed-Up Twins. New York: Morrow, 1952.
 Here Comes the Bus! New York: Morrow, 1963.
 Robert Rows the River. New York: Morrow, 1965.
 Taffy and Melissa Molasses. New York: Morrow, 1969.
 Two and Two is Four. New York: Morrow, 1968.
 A Christmas Fantasy. New York: Morrow, 1972. Illustrated by Glenys and Victor Ambrus.
 Away Went the Balloons. New York: Morrow, 1973.
 "C" Is for Cupcake. New York: Morrow, 1974.
 A Valentine Fantasy. New York: Morrow, 1976. Illustrated by Glenys and Victor Ambrus.
 Halloween Treats. New York: Morrow, 1981. Illustrated by Victoria de Larrea.
 The King's Monster. New York: Morrow, 1980. Illustrated by Victor Ambrus.
 Santa Claus Forever! New York: Morrow, 1982. Illustrated by Glenys and Victor Ambrus.
 Make a Joyful Noise: Bible Verses for Children. Philadelphia: Westminster Press, 1984. Illustrated by Lane Yerkes.
 Happy Birthday from Carolyn Haywood. New York: Morrow, 1984. Illustrated by Wendy Watson.
 Summer Fun. New York: Morrow, 1986. Illustrated by Julie Durrell.
 How the Reindeer Saved Santa. New York: Morrow, 1986. Illustrated by Victor Ambrus.
 Hello, Star. New York: Morrow, 1987. Illustrated by Julie Durrell.

References

Further reading
 Conmire, Anne, ed. Something About the Author, #29. Gale Research Company: Detroit, 1982.
 Haycroft, Howard & Stanley J. Kunitz, ed. The Junior Book of Authors. New York: H.W. Wilson Company, 1951.
 Shachter, Jacqueline. Carolyn Haywood and Jane Flory. Profiles in Literature, vol. 35. (video series) Philadelphia: Temple University Department of Educational Media, 1979.

External links

 Carolyn Haywood at GoodReads.com
 

1898 births
1990 deaths
American children's writers
Artists from Philadelphia
Writers from Philadelphia